Tanzania Airports Authority (TAA) was founded in 1999 by an Act of Parliament. The authority is responsible for the provision of airport services, ground support, infrastructure and construction of airports in Tanzania.  The Authority operates under the purview of the Ministry of Infrastructure Development.

TAA main offices are located in Dar es Salaam and at Julius Nyerere International Airport.

See also
List of airports in Tanzania
Tanzania Civil Aviation Authority
Ministry of Infrastructure Development, Tanzania

References

External links
Tanzania Airport Authority 

Airport
Aviation in Tanzania
Airport operators
Organizations established in 1999
1999 establishments in Tanzania